Age of consent is the minimum age at which a person is considered to be legally competent to consent to sexual acts.

Age of consent may also refer to:

Books
Age of Consent, a semi-autobiographical 1938 novel by Norman Lindsay 
Age of Consent, a 1987 novel by Joanne Greenberg 
Age of Consent, a 2016 novel by Marti Leimbach
The Age of Consent, a 1995 novel by American writer Geoffrey Wolff
The Age of Consent: A Manifesto for a New World Order, a book by political writer George Monbiot
The Age of Consent, a 1998 non-fiction book by Robert H. Knight

Films
Age of Consent (film), a 1969 film directed by Michael Powell and loosely based on the Norman Lindsay novel
The Age of Consent (film), a 1932 black-and-white film directed by Gregory La Cava

Music
Age of Consent (band), an English band
Age of Consent (album), a 1988 album by Virgin Steele
The Age of Consent (album), a first album by 1980s British synthpop trio Bronski Beat
"Age of Consent", a 1969 song by Ronnie Burns
"Age of Consent", a song by art rock band 10cc from their 1995 album Mirror Mirror
"Age of Consent" (song), from the New Order album Power, Corruption & Lies

Other
Age of consent reform, any of several movements to change the legal age of consent